The Moro IV Cabinet, led by Aldo Moro, was the 31st cabinet of the Italian Republic. It held office from 1974 to 1976.

The government obtained confidence on 5 December 1974 in the Senate, with 190 votes in favor and 113 against, and on 7 December in the Chamber of Deputies, with 355 votes in favor, 226 against and 19 abstentions.

Party breakdown
 Christian Democracy (DC): prime minister, 19 ministers, 39 undersecretaries
 Italian Republican Party (PRI): deputy prime minister, 4 ministers, 4 undersecretaries

Composition

|}

References

Italian governments
1974 establishments in Italy
1976 disestablishments in Italy
Cabinets established in 1974
Cabinets disestablished in 1976
Aldo Moro